The Treasurer of the Household is a member of the Royal Household of the Sovereign of the United Kingdom. The position is usually held by one of the government deputy Chief Whips in the House of Commons. The current holder of the office is Marcus Jones MP.

The position had its origin in the office of Treasurer (or Keeper) of the Wardrobe and was ranked second after the Lord Steward. The office was often staffed by the promotion of the Comptroller of the Household. On occasion (e.g. 1488–1503) the office was vacant for a considerable period and its duties undertaken by the Cofferer of the Household. By the end of the 17th century the office of Treasurer was more or less a sinecure, and in the 18th and 19th centuries it was usually occupied by peers who were members of the Government. The Treasurer was automatically a member of the privy council. They were a member of the Board of Green Cloth until that was abolished by reform of local government licensing in 2004 under section 195 of the Licensing Act 2003. 

On state occasions, the Treasurer of the Household (in common with certain other senior officers of the Household) carries a white staff of office.

Treasurers of the Household

15th century
John Tiptoft, 1st Baron Tiptoft 1406–1408
Roger Leche 1413–1416
Walter Beauchamp 1421–1430
Sir John Tyrrell of Heron May 1431 – April 1437
John Popham 1437–1439
Sir Roger Fiennes 1439–1446
John Stourton, 1st Baron Stourton 1446–1453
Sir Thomas Tuddenham 1458
Sir John Fogge 1461–1468
Sir John Howard 1468–1474.
Sir John Elrington 1474–1483
Sir William Hopton 1483–1484
Sir Richard Croft 1484–1488
vacant 1488 on: office performed by cofferers:
John Payne 1488–1492
William Fisher 1492–1494
William Cope 1494-?1508 (died 1513)

16th century
Sir Andrew Windsor 1513
Sir Thomas Lovell 1502 (by)-c. 1519
Sir Edward Poynings 1519–1521
Sir Thomas Boleyn 1521–1525
Sir William FitzWilliam 1525–1537
Sir William Paulet 1537–1539
Sir Thomas Cheney 1539–1558
Sir Thomas Parry 1559–1560
vacant 1560–1570
Sir Francis Knollys 1570–1596
The Lord North 1596–1600

17th century
vacant 1600–1602
Sir William Knollys 1602–1616
The Lord Wotton 1616–1618
Sir Thomas Edmonds 1618–1639
Sir Henry Vane 1639–1641
The Viscount Savile 1641–1649
Sir Frederick Cornwallis 1660–1663
The Viscount Fitzhardinge 1663–1668
Sir Thomas Clifford 1668–1672
The Lord Newport 1672–1686
The Earl of Yarmouth 1686–1689
The Earl of Bradford 1689–1708

18th century
The Earl of Cholmondeley 1708–1712
The Lord Lansdown 1712–1714
The Earl of Cholmondeley 1714–1725
Paul Methuen 1725–1730
The Lord Bingley 1730–1731
The Lord De La Warr 1731–1737
The Earl FitzWalter 1737–1755
The Lord Berkeley of Stratton 1755–1756
The Viscount Bateman 1756–1757
The Earl of Thomond 1757–1761
The Earl of Powis 1761–1765
Lord Edgcumbe 1765–1766
John Shelley 1766–1777
The Earl of Carlisle 1777–1779
The Lord Onslow 1779–1780
Viscount Cranborne 1780–1782
The Earl of Effingham 1782–1783
Charles Francis Greville 1783–1784
The Earl of Courtown 1784–1793
Viscount Stopford 1793–1806

19th century
Lord Ossulston 1806–1807
Viscount Stopford 1807–1812
Viscount Jocelyn 1812
Lord Charles Bentinck 1812–1826
Sir William Henry Fremantle 1826–1837
The Earl of Surrey 1837–1841
Hon. George Byng 1841
Earl Jermyn 1841–1846
Lord Robert Grosvenor 1846–1847
Lord Marcus Hill 1847–1852
Lord Claud Hamilton 1852
The Earl of Mulgrave 1853–1858
Lord Claud Hamilton 1858–1859
Viscount Bury 1859–1866
Lord Otho FitzGerald 1866
Lord Burghley 1866–1867
Hon. Percy Egerton Herbert 1867–1868
The Lord de Tabley 1868–1872
The Lord Poltimore 1872–1874
The Lord Monson 1874
Earl Percy 1874–1875
Lord Henry Thynne 1875–1880
The Earl of Breadalbane 1880–1885
Viscount Folkestone 1885–1886
The Earl of Elgin 1886
Viscount Folkestone 1886–1891
Lord Walter Gordon-Lennox 1891–1892
The Earl of Chesterfield 1892–1894
Arthur Brand 1894–1895
The Marquess of Carmarthen 1895–1896
Viscount Curzon 1896–1900

20th century

21st century

See also
 List of Treasurers to British royal consorts

References

1484–1649: Green Cloth Officeholders
1660–1837: Officeholders database

Whips 1970–1997

Positions within the British Royal Household
Ministerial offices in the United Kingdom